The Gwichʼin Tribal Council is a First Nations organization representing the Gwichʼin people of northern Canada, owning approximately 23,884 square kilometres of land in Yukon and the Northwest Territories. It was created in 1992 with the final ratification of the Gwichʼin Comprehensive Land Claim Agreement with the Government of Canada. Negotiations to achieve a Final Agreement, and thus, Gwichʼin self-government, are ongoing.

History 

The Gwichʼin people have been present in Alaska, Yukon, and the Northwest Territories since time immemorial. In 1921, chiefs and headmen representing the Gwichʼin (then known as the Loucheux) population in Canada signed Treaty 11, but unresolved differences arose between the interpretation of aboriginal and treaty rights by the Gwichʼin and by Canada, and many obligations were never fulfilled. To provide certainty and clarity of rights to land ownership, and to ensure various rights and benefits to the Gwichʼin people, the Comprehensive Land Claim Agreement was signed as a modern treaty on April 22, 1992.

Members 

 Carcross/Tagish First Nation
 Champagne and Aishihik First Nation
 Ehdiitat Gwich'in Council
 First Nation of Nacho Nyak Dun
 Gwichya Gwich'in Council
 Kluane First Nation
 Little Salmon Carmacks First Nation
 Nihtat Gwich'in Council
 Selkirk First Nation
 Ta'an Kwach'an Council
 Teslin Tlingit Council
 Tetlin Gwich'in Council
 Tr'ondek Hwech'in

Powers and responsibilities 

Although not a full self-government, the Gwichʼin Tribal Council has authority over planning and conservation within its jurisdiction, and exercises full ownership of various lands and organizations. These holdings include subsurface rights to certain parcels in the NWT, as well as the Gwichʼin Development Corporation and Gwichʼin Settlement Corporation. An additional Yukon Transboundary Agreement extends some of these rights into a part of neighbouring Yukon, provided that other First Nations in that jurisdiction are co-operated with.

Footnotes 

Gwich'in
Politics of the Northwest Territories
First Nations in the Northwest Territories
Inuvik Region
First Nations governments
First Nations tribal councils